This article lists all the  captains of the Scotland national football team. As of 16 November 2022, Scotland have played 816 officially recognised international matches and have had 155 different team captains. George Young captained Scotland most often, with 48. Four other players (Billy Bremner, Darren Fletcher, Gary McAllister and Andrew Robertson) have captained the team at least 30 times.

The first captain of the Scotland team was Robert Gardner, who led the team in the first ever international match, against England on 30 November 1872. He went on to captain Scotland on just one further occasion, the second international match, on 8 March 1873, against the same opposition.

List of captains
Key

Statistics include official FIFA recognised matches, five matches from a 1967 overseas tour that were reclassified as full internationals in 2021, and a match against a Hong Kong League XI played on 23 May 2002 that the Scottish Football Association includes in its statistical totals.

Unofficial games
The above list considers captains selected for games officially recognised by FIFA and the Scottish Football Association. In addition to these, there have been a number of games played by Scotland teams on an unofficial basis, for example the "wartime internationals" during the Second World War. Some of the captains selected for these unofficial games are listed below.

Jimmy Brownlie
Jimmy Gordon
Tom Smith
Matt Busby
Bill Shankly
Tommy Walker
Jock Shaw
George Young

Notes

References

External links
 Scotland captains by date, London Hearts Supporters' Club

Captains
Scotland
Association football player non-biographical articles